"Going Blind" is a song by the Australian indie rock band The Go-Betweens that was released as the lead single from their seventh album The Friends of Rachel Worth. It was released as a CD single by W. Minc Records (the label of their former manager, Steve Miller) in Australia, on the Circus Records label in the United Kingdom and Jetset Records (for whom former band member, Robert Vickers, was the label's publicist) in the United States in September 2000. "Going Blind" was The Go-Betweens' first single since "Love Goes On" in 1989.

Recording
The song was recorded during the recording sessions for The Friends of Rachel Worth at the Jackpot Recording Studios in Portland, Oregon. As the band's previous drummer, Glen Thompson, was unavailable they took up an offer from Sleater-Kinney's drummer, Janet Weiss, to fill in.  Weiss' partner Sam Coomes (Quasi) was included on keyboards, together with the other members of Sleater-Kinney, Carrie Brownstein and Corin Tucker.

Brownstein commenting "I played guitar on 'Going Blind' and Corin sang on that song. I really had a good time but I was there so briefly that it was all work, I just went in and did it and left. My part on the records, which they loved - "Oh, that's perfect!" - that was so funny because basically what I did was listen to all my Go-Betweens records, and just write a Go-Betweens part. And they were like, "it's great!" I said "well thank, but that's because it's exactly what you do on your records.""

After recording the album, Forster and McLennan took the master tapes to Germany to mix them with Mario Thaler at Uphon Tonstudios in Wellheim. The album's sound engineer, Larry Crane, stating "I still don't enjoy the mixes for 'German Farmhouse' or 'Going Blind'; I think the vocals are too loud."

Reception
Allmusic's Ned Raggett commented that "It would have been extremely amusing had this been a cover of the similarly titled Kiss song, if only for the image of Grant McLennan wailing like a banshee while Robert Forster spat blood. Such a pleasure was denied, but it was all for the good; this Friends of Rachel Worth selection has its own brief (under three minutes) and gently active energy, reminiscent of solo songs like "Lighting Fires" as much as his band efforts. Janet Weiss's drumming shows why she was a fine choice to stand in for Lindy Morrison, adding both power and subtle grace in equal measure to the song, while her gentle backing vocals back McLennan's portrait of emotional bemusement just so. It doesn't stand forth and scream its genius, but then when did that ever describe the Go-Betweens anyway? Its low-key quality is all there for the enjoying."

Richard A. Martin in CMJ New Music Monthly stated, "the assertive, kind of jaunty single, 'Going Blind' ranks with 'Cattle and Cane' and other early favourites, an amazing feat for a band that skipped a decade."

Spin was not so complimentary, stating "in Thomas Pynchon's 1963 novel V. there's a character named Gouveneur 'Roony' Winsome, owner of Outlandish Records. If there ever was one single song designed to be released by that label, it would be this outlandishly winsome little pop tune from an 80's band that's as out of place as it is out of time. But then, if life was as excellent as  Pynchon novels, sweet little nothing Go-Betweens would be stars."

Track listing

Release history

Personnel
Go-Betweens
 Robert Forster – vocals, organ, guitar
 Grant McLennan – vocals, guitar
 Adele Pickvance – bass, backing vocals
 Janet Weiss – drums, backing vocals
 Sam Coomes - keyboards
Additional musicians
 Jen Chorowhas - violin
 Carrie Brownstein - guitar ("Going Blind") 
 Corin Tucker - vocals ("Going Blind")

Production
 Artwork, Photography - Martin Schori
 Engineer – Larry Crane
 Mixing - Mario Thaler
 Producer - The Go-Betweens

References

External links
 "Going Blind" @ AllMusic
 "Going Blind" @ Discogs
 "Going Blind" @ MusicBrainz

2000 singles
The Go-Betweens songs
2000 songs
Songs written by Grant McLennan
Songs written by Robert Forster (musician)